Nozal Hill is an ice-covered hill probably over , standing  north of Mount Shackleton and midway between Regnard Peaks and Blanchard Ridge on the west coast of Graham Land. Discovered by the French Antarctic Expedition, 1908–10, under Charcot, who named it for Monsieur Nozal, seaman, and later lieutenant on the ship Pourquoi-Pas?.

Hills of Graham Land
Graham Coast